Alki (ælkaɪ) is a Chinook word meaning by and by, the unofficial state motto of Washington.

It may also refer to:

Alki Point, Seattle, a geographic feature
Alki Point Light, a lighthouse an Alki Point
Alki Beach Park, a park at Alki Point
Alki Larnaca FC, a Cypriot football team that played from 1948 to 2014
Alki Oroklini, a Cypriot football club based in Larnaca
Alki David (born c. 1967–1968), a Greek businessman
Alki Zei (born 1925), a Greek novelist
Alki (boat), a fireboat in Seattle